Chromosome 3 is one of the 23 pairs of chromosomes in humans. People normally have two copies of this chromosome. Chromosome 3 spans 201 million base pairs (the building material of DNA) and represents about 6.5 percent of the total DNA in cells.

Genes

Number of genes
The following are some of the gene count estimates of human chromosome 3. Because researchers use different approaches to genome annotation their predictions of the number of genes on each chromosome varies (for technical details, see gene prediction). Among various projects, the collaborative consensus coding sequence project (CCDS) takes an extremely conservative strategy. So CCDS's gene number prediction represents a lower bound on the total number of human protein-coding genes.

List of genes 

The following is a partial list of genes on human chromosome 3. For complete list, see the link in the infobox on the right.

p-arm
Partial list of the genes  located on p-arm (short arm) of human chromosome 3:

q-arm
Partial list of the genes located on q-arm (long arm) of human chromosome 3:

Diseases and disorders

The following diseases and disorders are some of those related to genes on chromosome 3:

 3-Methylcrotonyl-CoA carboxylase deficiency
 3q29 microdeletion syndrome
 Acute myeloid leukemia (AML)
 Alkaptonuria
 Arrhythmogenic right ventricular dysplasia
 Atransferrinemia
 Autism
Autosomal dominant optic atrophy
ADOA plus syndrome
 Biotinidase deficiency
 Blepharophimosis, epicanthus inversus and ptosis type 1
 Breast/colon/lung/pancreatic cancer
 Brugada syndrome
 Castillo fever
 Carnitine-acylcarnitine translocase deficiency
 Cataracts
 Cerebral cavernous malformation
 Charcot–Marie–Tooth disease, type 2
 Charcot–Marie–Tooth disease
 Chromosome 3q duplication syndrome
 Coproporphyria
 A location on human chromosome 3 is associated with respiratory failure and possibly with increased severity in COVID-19
 Dandy–Walker syndrome
 Deafness
 Diabetes
 Dystrophic epidermolysis bullosa
 Endplate acetylcholinesterase deficiency
 Essential tremors
 Ectrodactyly, Case 4
 Glaucoma, primary open angle
 Glycogen storage disease
 Hailey–Hailey disease
 Harderoporphyrinuria
 Heart block, progressive/nonprogressive
 Hereditary coproporphyria
 Hereditary nonpolyposis colorectal cancer
 HIV infection, susceptibility/resistance to
 Hypobetalipoproteinemia, familial
 Hypothermia
 Leukoencephalopathy with vanishing white matter
 Long QT syndrome
 Lymphomas
 Malignant hyperthermia susceptibility
 Metaphyseal chondrodysplasia, Murk Jansen type
 Microcoria
 Möbius syndrome
 Moyamoya disease
 Mucopolysaccharidosis
 Muir–Torre family cancer syndrome
 Myotonic dystrophy 
 Neuropathy, hereditary motor and sensory, Okinawa type
 Night blindness
 Nonsyndromic deafness
 Ovarian cancer
 Porphyria
 Propionic acidemia
 Protein S deficiency
 Pseudo-Zellweger syndrome
 Retinitis pigmentosa
 Romano–Ward syndrome
 Seckel syndrome
 Sensenbrenner syndrome
 Septo-optic dysplasia
 Short stature
 Spinocerebellar ataxia
 Sucrose intolerance
 T-cell leukemia translocation altered gene
 Usher syndrome
 von Hippel–Lindau syndrome
 Waardenburg syndrome
 Xeroderma pigmentosum, complementation group c

Cytogenetic band

See also
RTP3 (gene)

References

External links

 
 

Chromosome 03